This is a list of diplomatic missions in Guyana. 

There are currently 14 embassies and high commissions in Georgetown. Several other countries have ambassadors accredited to Guyana on a non-resident basis. 

This listing excludes honorary consulates.

Diplomatic missions in Georgetown

Embassies/High Commissions
Entries marked with an asterisk (*) are member-states of the Commonwealth of Nations. As such, their embassies are formally termed as high commissions.

Other delegations or representative offices
 (Regional Delegation)

Non-resident embassies

Resident in Brasilia, Brazil

Resident in Caracas, Venezuela

Resident in Havana, Cuba

Resident in New York City, United States of America

Resident in Port-of-Spain, Trinidad and Tobago

Resident elsewhere

 (Bogotá)
 (Nassau)
 (Saint Michael, Barbados)
 (Washington, D.C.)
 (Paramaribo)
 (Kingston, Jamaica)
 (Paramaribo)
 (Jerusalem)
 (Washington, D.C.)
 (Paramaribo)
 (Bridgetown)
 (Ottawa)
 (Washington, D.C.)
 (Castries)
 (Stockholm)
 (Bogotá)

Former Embassies

See also
 Foreign relations of Guyana
 List of diplomatic missions of Guyana
 Visa policy of Guyana

Notes

References

 Ministry of Foreign Affairs of Guyana

 
Guyana
Diplomatic missions